The Ragpicker of Paris (German: Der Lumpensammler von Paris) is a 1922 Austrian silent film directed by Hans Otto and starring Dora Kaiser, Franz Herterich and Olaf Fjord.

Cast
 Dora Kaiser
 Franz Herterich
 Olaf Fjord
 Hans Otto Lundt
 Carl Huber
 Paul Baratoff
 Lola Urban-Kneidinger
 Dora Kaiser
 Tini Senders

References

Bibliography
 Fritz, Walter & Lachmann, Götz. Im Kino erlebe ich die Welt--: 100 Jahre Kino und Film in Österreich. Verlag Christian Brandstätter, 1997.

External links

1922 films
Austrian silent feature films
Films directed by Hans Otto
Austrian black-and-white films